Tangelo Park is a census-designated place and an unincorporated area in Orange County, Florida, United States. The population was 2,231 at the 2010 census. It is part of the Orlando–Kissimmee Metropolitan Statistical Area.


Geography

According to the United States Census Bureau, the CDP has a total area of 0.9 km (0.3 mi2), all land.

The neighborhood is built on land formerly used for orange groves and named after the tangelo, a particular hybrid of citrus that mixed tangerines and pomelos. Originally built as housing for workers at the nearby missile testing grounds, it has become an isolated residential area surrounded by big-box stores and tourist traps on International Drive, as well as office parks and resorts to the east.

Demographics

As of the census of 2000, there were 2,430 people, 747 households, and 595 families residing in the CDP.  The population density was 2,759.5/km (7,115.0/mi2).  There were 784 housing units at an average density of 890.3/km (2,295.5/mi2).  The racial makeup of the CDP was 7.41% White, 89.05% African American, 0.12% Native American, 0.21% Asian, 0.08% Pacific Islander, 1.15% from other races, and 1.98% from two or more races. Hispanic or Latino of any race were 2.63% of the population.

There were 747 households, out of which 37.8% had children under the age of 18 living with them, 42.3% were married couples living together, 30.8% had a female householder with no husband present, and 20.3% were non-families. 15.5% of all households were made up of individuals, and 4.6% had someone living alone who was 65 years of age or older.  The average household size was 3.25 and the average family size was 3.58.

In the CDP, the population was spread out, with 33.5% under the age of 18, 9.5% from 18 to 24, 26.5% from 25 to 44, 23.0% from 45 to 64, and 7.4% who were 65 years of age or older.  The median age was 30 years. For every 100 females, there were 93.6 males.  For every 100 females age 18 and over, there were 80.0 males.

The median income for a household in the CDP was $32,568, and the median income for a family was $33,710. Males had a median income of $22,379 versus $20,027 for females. The per capita income for the CDP was $11,744.  About 11.3% of families and 13.9% of the population were below the poverty line, including 16.4% of those under age 18 and 7.1% of those age 65 or over.

Education
Tangelo Park is served by Orange County Public Schools. Education is provided through Tangelo Park Elementary School, Southwest Middle School, and Doctor Phillips High School.

In 1993, Harris Rosen "adopted" Tangelo Park, offering free preschool for children in the community and funding university and college educations for high school graduates from Tangelo Park. By 2013 he had donated about $10 million to the community. Speaking in 2015, the sheriff of Orange County described Tangelo Park as "a changed neighborhood", with a significant reduction in violent crime. Rosen recalled his first visit to an elementary school class in Tangelo Park at the start of the project, where only two or three children expressed a desire to go on to college, to which Rosen said "That has to change." When he returned and asked the same question a year later, "every hand went up".

References

Unincorporated communities in Orange County, Florida
Census-designated places in Orange County, Florida
Greater Orlando
Census-designated places in Florida
Unincorporated communities in Florida